The 1994 Cleveland Browns season was the team's 45th season with the National Football League and 49th overall. It was the only season that the Browns qualified for the playoffs under head coach Bill Belichick. The Browns finished as the NFL's number one defense in terms of points surrendered per game (12.8 points per game). In the playoffs, Belichick got his first playoff victory as a head coach in the AFC wild card game against his eventual current team, the New England Patriots, 20–13. The Browns would lose to the Steelers 29–9 in the divisional round.

The Browns would not return to the playoffs again until the 2002 season. This would be the last time the Browns would win a playoff game until the 2020 season.

Offseason

NFL draft

Trades Made 
 Traded 2x11 and 1995 2x26 to Philadelphia Eagles for 1x29

Personnel

Staff

Roster

Schedule 

Note: Intra-division opponents are in bold text.

Standings

Game Summaries 
 Week One @ Cincinnati
Both Vinny Testaverde and falling third-year Bengal David Klingler were picked off twice. Testaverde got the better of the first round of 1994's Battle Of Ohio as he raced the Browns to a 28–13 lead, enough to absorb a Klingler touchdown in the fourth to Darnay Scott. The Browns won 28–20.

 Week Two vs. Pittsburgh
The Steelers ended a four-game road losing streak to the Browns as they erased a 10–0 Browns lead with 17 unanswered points. Vinny Testaverde was picked off four times in the 17–10 loss.

Week 3: vs. Arizona 

The Browns hosted Buddy Ryan, now coach of the Cardinals after his tumultuous stay with the Oilers. Ryan had to bear witness as Vinny Testaverde tossed two touchdowns and ran in a third while Jay Schroeder and Jim McMahon combined for just 26 of 58 passes with three interceptions in a 32–0 Browns shutout win.

 Week Four @ Indianapolis
In a 21–14 Browns win, Testaverde threw three more touchdowns as the game lead tied or changed on every score. Testaverde's scores offset scores by Marshall Faulk and Jim Harbaugh, both destined to be important rivals of Browns coach Bill Belichick in the future.

 Week Five vs. New York Jets
Eight years after their infamous playoff meeting, the Jets and Browns renewed acquaintances and the Browns raced to a 27–0 lead before Jack Trudeau, subbing for regular starter Boomer Esiason, found the endzone from 24 yards out. Trudeau was picked off twice as well in the 27–7 Browns win. The game was the first meeting as head coaches of Jets coach Pete Carroll and Browns coach Bill Belichick.

 Week Six – BYE WEEK
 Week Seven @ Houston
On a rare Thursday Night NFL game, the collapse of the Oilers following their 1993 season continued as the Browns clawed out a Vinny Testaverde touchdown, a two-point conversion, and a field goal in the second quarter, offsetting a fourth-quarter score from Billy Joe Tolliver. The 11–8 loss put the Oilers at 1–5 with the Browns now 5–1.

 Week Eight vs. Cincinnati
The winless Bengals clawed to a 13–10 halftime lead, then the Browns exploded to 27 unanswered points en route to a 37–13 rout; one touchdown came off a goalline fumble by the Bengals. Former Redskins hero Mark Rypien came in late and completed three of eleven passes.

 Week Nine @ Denver
The Browns remained haunted by the ghost of their two bitter playoff failures to John Elway as Elway led a Broncos offense putting up 457 yards of offense and 26 points to offset two Matt Stover field goals and a touchdown from Mark Rypien. The 26–14 Broncos win was only the third of their season.

 Week 10 vs. New England
Bill Belichick faced his former boss Bill Parcells and got the better of Parcells and second-year quarterback Drew Bledsoe, intercepting him four times as Mark Rypien tossed a one-yard score to Leroy Hoard. The 13–6 outcome put the Browns at 7–2 while the Patriots fell to 3–6 awaiting the Vikings.

 Week 11 @ Philadelphia
The 7–2 Eagles were crushed 26–7 as Randall Cunningham was picked off once and held to just 242 yards of offense; the loss began a season-ending spiral for the Eagles and coach Rich Kotite.

 Week 12 @ Kansas City
Joe Montana managed only 169 passing yards but still got the better of the Browns 20–13 as three different passers for the Browns managed only 152 yards and a pick.

 Week 13 vs. Houston
The Browns completed a season sweep of the Oilers – now under new coach Jeff Fisher – 34–10, limiting the Oilers to 182 yards of offense.

 Week 14 vs. New York Giants
Facing his former team, Bill Belichick saw the Giants unable to reach 300 yards of offense yet still win 16–13, picking off Vinny Testaverde twice while sacking him four times. The game was a penalty-laden affair with 21 combined fouls for 162 yards.

 Week 15 @ Dallas
Once again Testaverde couldn't deliver much yardage – just 118 passing yards with one touchdown and one interception – but he did produce enough for a 19–14 win over the defending Super Bowl champions. The Browns picked off Troy Aikman twice while forcing two fumbles. Matt Stover's four field goals were sufficient for the win.

 Week 16 @ Pittsburgh
The measuring stick for the Browns has always been the Steelers and once again the Browns came up short, this time 17–7. Testaverde had one touchdown and two picks while Barry Foster rushed for 106 yards and Neil O'Donnell had 175 passing yards and a touchdown. The win locked up the AFC Central for the Steelers, but the Browns nonetheless were also in the playoffs.

 Week 17 vs. Seattle
Vinny Testaverde scored three times, once on the ground, as five different Cleveland backs combined for over 100 rushing yards and two additional scores in a 35–7 rout of the Seahawks. With vaunted 1993 rookie Rick Mirer faltering, two different Seahawks quarterbacks combined for 229 yards and a pick.

Postseason

AFC Wild Card game 

This was the Browns' most recent home playoff game and their last playoff victory until January 10, 2021, when Baker Mayfield led the Browns to a victory over the Pittsburgh Steelers in the AFC Wild Card Playoff Game.

AFC Divisional Game

References

External links 
 1994 Cleveland Browns at Pro Football Reference (Profootballreference.com)
 1994 Cleveland Browns Statistics at jt-sw.com
 1994 Cleveland Browns Schedule at jt-sw.com
 1994 Cleveland Browns at DatabaseFootball.com  

Cleveland
Cleveland Browns seasons
Cleveland